The GCC Champions League, is an annually organized football league tournament for club of the Arabian Peninsula.

The 2002 edition was the 19th time that it was organised and was won by Saudi Arabian side Al-Ahli for the second time.

Results

''All match were played in  Bahrain.

Winner

 
 

GCC Champions League
Gulf Club Champions Cup, 2002